Christianity is a significant religion in Kaduna State, Nigeria's northwestern region. The state is home to the Roman Catholic Diocese of Zaria, the Roman Catholic Archdiocese of Kaduna, and the Roman Catholic Diocese of Kafanchan.

Additionally, there is the Church of Nigeria's ecclesiastical province of Kaduna. The Church of Christ has branches throughout the state. Within the state Pentecostal ministries, there are megachurches such as the Throneroom (Trust) Ministry founded by Emmanuel Nuhu Kure and the Winners' Chapel founded by David Oyedepo. 

Kaduna State is divided between Christians and Muslims; Sharia law is applicable in areas with a Muslim majority. There is an Interfaith Mediation Center. In 2002, the Religious Leaders of Kaduna signed the Kaduna Peace Declaration. Kaduna City is divided into two sections, one Christian and one Muslim. In 2002, the state carried out the first execution under Islamic law in the twenty-first century.

References

See also 
Persecution of Christians
Religion in Kaduna State

Kaduna State
Kaduna